Mere Ghar Aayi Ek Nanhi Pari (English: A Little Angel Came To My House) is an Indian television series which premiered on 9 March 2009 on Colors TV. The story revolves around a family who experience the birth of a daughter after long 18 years.

Plot
The story revolves around Roshan Chawla, a popular sweet shopkeeper in Delhi whose generations were all males yet he yearned for a girl from his expecting daughter-in-law. And after all, his expectations came true- he had a granddaughter, named Chandni for whom he had been waiting since forty years, and the whole family rejoices. But their joy was unaware of the upcoming turmoil they had to face- while Chandni was still an infant, she was bereft of her mother who was killed in a riot, leaving his father mentally disturbed. As she grew up, she not only falls in love with Rajveer, a charming young male, but also has a dual responsibility of sustaining her father. But her love story with Rajveer wasn't going to be easy, it still had obstacles to face.

Chandni fall in love with Rajveer during the Goa trip. Chandni got married with Paramjeet, a boy who told he is from Canada but he lied to the innocent girl's family for money. Paramjeet took the girl to a village and lived their pretending to chandini's family that they are in canada. He is also married already to another lady which Chandni finds out about when she gets married. Chandni's family thought that she is happy in Canada with her husband. One day Rajveer discovered about Chandni, he found her and saved her by calling the police and exposing the truth to her family. Later they get married.

Cast
 Mugdha Chaphekar as Chandni Chawla
 Karan Wahi as Rajveer Malhotra
 Kulbhushan Kharbanda as Roshanlal Chawla (Lalaji)
 Sachin Khurana as Karan Chawla
 Vaishnavi Mahant as Neeru Karan Chawla / Neeru Girish Chawla 
 Pankaj Berry as Girish Chawla
 Rajeev Paul
 Akshay Anand as Mr. Chawla (Chandni's father)
 Anjali Mukhi as Kusum Chawla
 Manoj Bidwai as Paramjeet
 Jayshree Arora as Guneeta Ramlall Chawla
 Trishikha Tripathi as Simmi
 Yamini Singh
 Indraneel Bhattacharya
 Diya Sonecha as Child Chandni Chawla

References

External links
Mere Ghar Aayi Ek Nanhi Pari Official Site

Colors TV original programming
Indian drama television series
2009 Indian television series debuts
2009 Indian television series endings